Gilshochill railway station is a railway station serving the Gilshochill, Maryhill and Cadder areas of Glasgow, Scotland. The station is located on the Maryhill Line, 3 miles (5 km) north west of Glasgow Queen Street. Services are provided by ScotRail on behalf of Strathclyde Partnership for Transport. When the station was opened by British Rail in December 1993 it was named Lambhill, being renamed Gilshochill on 24 May 1998 under Railtrack.

Services 

With the timetable revision starting on 18 May 2014, a limited hourly Sunday service now operates on this line between 09:30 and 19:00.

References

External links 

Video footage of Gilshochill

Railway stations in Glasgow
Railway stations served by ScotRail
SPT railway stations
Railway stations in Great Britain opened in 1993
Railway stations opened by British Rail
Maryhill